William O'Brien, 2nd Marquess of Thomond, 6th Earl of Inchiquin, 1st Baron Tadcaster KP PC (I) (176521 August 1846) was an Irish peer. He succeeded by special remainder as Marquess of Thomond in 1808 on the death of his uncle Murrough O'Brien, 1st Marquess of Thomond and was appointed a Privy Councillor and Knight of the Order of St Patrick on 11 November 1809. He was created Baron Tadcaster in the British Peerage in 1826.

Early life 
O'Brien was born in Ennistymon, County Clare, to Captain Edward Dominic O'Brien, High Sheriff of Clare and Mary Carrick, daughter of Christopher Carrick and Áine McNally. His father was the grandson of William O'Brien, 3rd Earl of Inchiquin.

Death and succession 
On his death in 1846 his title passed by the same special remainder to his brother James O'Brien, 3rd Marquess of Thomond.

Family

William O'Brien married Elizabeth Rebecca Trotter (1775–1852), daughter of Thomas Trotter of Duleek, Co. Meath on 16 September 1799.
They had no son but four daughters:
Susan Maria married Captain later Rear-Admiral George Frederick Hotham RN and they were parents of Charles 4th Lord Hotham
Sarah married Major William Stanhope Taylor
Mary married Richard White, Viscount Berehaven who succeeded as 2nd Earl of Bantry
Elizabeth married George Stucley Bucke who in 1859 was made Sir George Stucley Stucley, 1st Baronet

References

1765 births
1846 deaths
18th-century Irish people
19th-century Irish people
Irish representative peers
Knights of St Patrick
Members of the Privy Council of Ireland
William
Marquesses of Thomond
Peers of the United Kingdom created by George IV
Irish chiefs of the name